Patsy De Forest (born Helen May Lanagan; May 1, 1894 – August 1, 1966) was an American actress of the silent cinema era who performed on the stage since childhood before acting in films.

Career
De Forest acted in over eighty films from 1912 to 1920, with over thirty appearances each in 1915 and in 1916. She worked with several production companies including Lubin Manufacturing Company, Vitagraph Studios and Fox Film Corporation. She acted in several comedies directed by Lawrence Semon of Vitagraph in the mid-1910s. She also acted in some Broadway musicals.

De Forest's last film appearance was in Sunset Sprague, a 1920 Western in which she was the female lead. She died in August 1966 at the age of 72.

Filmography

 Wifey's Ma Comes Back, directed by Arthur Hotaling (1912)
 Patsy at School, directed by Percy Winter (1914)
 Patsy's First Love (1915)
 Feel My Muscle
 Patsy at College
 Patsy's Vacation
 Patsy in Business
 Patsy on a Trolley Car
 Patsy in a Seminary
 His Soul Mate, directed by Joseph Kaufman (1915)
 Patsy at the Seashore
 Patsy's Elopement
 The Human Investment, directed by George Terwilliger (1915)
 Patsy Among the Fairies
 Patsy in Town
 Patsy Among the Smugglers
 Patsy on a Yacht
 Patsy, Married and Settled
 Out for a Stroll
 The New Butler, directed by Arthur Hotaling (1915)
 A Day on the Force
 The New Valet
 Wifey's Ma Comes Back
 When Wifey Sleeps
 Billie's Heiress
 Billie's Debut
 Queenie of the Nile
 Think of the Money
 Playing Horse
 The Cellar Spy
 His Three Brides
 Blaming the Duck, or Ducking the Blame
 And the Parrot Said...?
 The Great Detective, directed by Edwin McKim (1915)
 This Isn't the Life
 His Lordship, directed by Edwin McKim (1916)
 Fooling Uncle
 The New Janitor
 The Butler
 The Fatal Bean
 Otto the Bllboy
 Frocks and Frills
 Skirts and Cinders
 Otto the Artist
 Otto the Hero
 Trilby Frilled
 Otto the Reporter
 Otto the Cobbler
 Otto's Legacy
 No Place Like Jail
 Otto the Traffic Cop
 Otto's Vacation
 Otto the Sleuth
 Otto, the Salesman
 Otto, the Gardener
 Romance and Roughhouse, directed by Lawrence Semon (1916)
 There and Back
 A Villainous Villain
 Love and Loot
 Sand, Scamps and Strategy
 She Who Last Laughs
 Walls and Wallops
 Jumps and Jealousy
 His Conscious Conscience
 Hash and Havoc
 Help! Help! Help!
 Rah! Rah! Rah!
 Shanks and Chivalry
 Speed and Spunk
 Bullies and Bullets
 Cops and Cussedness
 The Gift of the Magi, directed by Brinsley Shaw (1917)
 Her Secret, directed by Perry N. Vekroff (1917)
 An Alabaster Box, directed by Chester Withey (1917)
 The Guilty Party, directed by Thomas R. Mills (1917)
 The Love Doctor, directed by Paul Scardon (1917)
 A Night in New Arabia, directed by Thomas R. Mills (1917)
 The Last Leaf, directed by Ashley Miller (1917)
 A Madison Square Arabian Night
 Lost on Dress Parade
 Bullin' the Bullsheviki
 My Girl Suzanne
 Square Shooter
 Sunset Sprague, directed by Paul Cazeneuve and Thomas N. Heffron (1920)

Theatrical Appearances

All Aboard (Broadway, June 5, 1913)
The Red Canary (Broadway, April 13, 1914)
The Peasant Girl (Broadway, March 2, 1915)
Come Along (Broadway, April 8, 1919)
Oh, What A Girl! (Broadway, July 28, 1919)

References

Actresses from Louisville, Kentucky
American silent film actresses
20th-century American actresses
American musical theatre actresses
1894 births
1966 deaths